Mackaya neesiana is a plant species in the family Acanthaceae. It has various synonyms including Ruellia neesiana and Asystasiella neesiana. This species is cited in Journals of Travels in Assam, Burma, Bhootan, Afghanistan and The Neighbouring Countries by William Griffith under the synonym Ruellia neesiana.

References

Acanthaceae
Flora of Asia